Đoàn Văn Toại (1945 in Vietnam – November 2017 in California) was a Vietnamese-born naturalized American activist and the author of The Vietnamese Gulag (Simon & Schuster, 1986).

Biography 
Doan became an antiwar activist, a supporter of the National Liberation Front and vice president of the Saigon Student Union in 1969 and 1970, and spent time in jails in South Vietnam for antigovernment activities as a student leader. After the invasion of the North Vietnamese Army and the end of the Vietnam War in 1975, he became a senior official of the Ministry of Finance under the Provisional Government. He soon disagreed on purely professional grounds with a superior official and was jailed for 28 months. He left Vietnam in May 1978 and went into exile in Paris.

In 1989, he was shot and seriously wounded by two Asian males as he was walking in the area around his home in California. The shooting happened during a spate of attacks on foreign resident dissident Vietnamese and was widely believed to have been politically motivated. Doan's advocacy of the recognition of the government of Vietnam and proposal that the US government should establish diplomatic ties was not universally liked in the Vietnamese community and there was speculation that he was shot by anti-Communist protestors.

Doan Van Toai was also the author of these books: 
Documents on prisons in Viet-Nam
A Vietcong Memoir (Mémoires d'un Vietcong, w/ Nhu Tang Truong, David Chanoff)
Vietnam: A Portrait of its People at War (w/ David Chanoff)
Portrait of the Enemy: The Other Side of Vietnam, Told through Interviews with North Vietnamese, Former Vietcong and Southern Opposition Leaders (w/ David Chanoff).

See also
 Alexander Solzhenitsyn

References

External links 
 About the author
 Rethinking the revolution, The New York Times, July 13, 1986
A Lament for Vietnam, by Doan Van Toai in The New York Times, 1981

Toai, Van. Doan
Toai, Van. Doan
Toai, Van. Doan
Toai, Van. Doan
Toai, Van. Doan
Toai, Van. Doan
Prisoners and detainees of Vietnam
Toai, Van. Doan
Writers of Vietnamese descent
Toai, Van. Doan
French male writers
Naturalized citizens of the United States

American people of Vietnamese descent